Westbury railway station serves the town of Westbury in Wiltshire, England. The station is managed by Great Western Railway.

The station is a major junction, serving the Reading to Taunton line with services to and from Penzance and London Paddington; the Wessex Main Line with services to and from Cardiff and Portsmouth, also Swindon; the Heart of Wessex Line with local services from Bristol Temple Meads to Weymouth; and services to London Waterloo.

The buffet at Westbury appeared in a list of "highly commended" station cafes published in The Guardian in 2009.

History

In the 1880s, the station was one of the meeting places of the South and West Wilts Hunt.

In 1899, Westbury station was entirely rebuilt to cater for the 1900 line, creating two island platforms six hundred feet long and forty feet wide. It has since been rebuilt and remodelled several times, most recently when the area was resignalled in 1985 (when the Down Salisbury platform line was lifted), but without changing the underlying form created in 1901. In 2013 the Swindon and Wiltshire Local Transport Body prioritised the reopening of this platform face at an estimated cost of £5.4m.

A freight yard next to the station is used by bulk limestone trains from the rail-served quarries at Merehead and Whatley in Somerset. In April 2009 the rail-served Lafarge cement works to the east was closed.

Accidents and incidents 
On 28 October 1873, a mail train passed a signal at danger and collided with a luggage train.

On 6 December 2011, a train was derailed at Westbury.

Services
The station is served by all three main routes that pass through it.

Others run to Frome, Warminster and Southampton.

The frequency on this route was improved substantially (to eight trains each way weekdays, five on Sundays) at the December 2013 timetable change.

Future 
The line to Westbury is not due to be electrified as part of the 21st-century modernisation of the Great Western Main Line. Although local councillors support it, the extension of electrification beyond  to Westbury was assessed as having a benefit–cost ratio of only 0.31.

References

External links
Video footage of Westbury railway station

Former Great Western Railway stations
Railway stations in Great Britain opened in 1848
Railway stations served by Great Western Railway
Railway stations in Wiltshire
Westbury, Wiltshire
Railway stations served by South Western Railway
DfT Category D stations